Claes J M Loberg (born 1 January 1970) is a Swedish born Australian technology entrepreneur and designer who founded the music streaming and downloading service Guvera. in 2008, and Zero Party Deep Data Platform, Bounty Media in 2019, funded by SOSV in Singapore.

Early life and education 
Loberg was born in Sweden on January 1, 1970 and grew up in Woolgoolga, NSW and attended Woolgoolga High School. He was educated in fine arts at Lund University Sweden, Business & Leadership at London Business School United Kingdom, and International Business at QUT Graduate school of business Australia.

Career 
Loberg founded his first company Hyro.com in 1994, which was listed on the Australian stock exchange (ASX:HYO) and ranked as one of the biggest IT and web development companies in Australia with offices in China, Thailand and Australia.

Loberg was one of the founding team of BCMA (Branded Content Marketing Association) in London in 2004, assisting with partners in Australia and the USA. researching specifically the concept of advertiser brands distributing vs disrupting content.

Loberg founded Guvera in 2008 with Brad Christiansen. In 2010, Guvera was launched as an MP3 site. Loberg and helped raise an initial $20 million investment for Guvera through private equity firm AMMA.

Guvera was ranked by Billboard Magazine as one of the Best Digital Music Startups of 2010.

Loberg was listed in Ernst & Young 2011 Entrepreneur of the year after winning the Technology category in Australia.

Loberg Co-Founded Bounty Media Zero Party Deep Data platform with Jake Denney  in Singapore in 2019, Funded by Venture Capital company SOSV April 2021 as reported in Tech in Asia

Guvera

In 2008 Loberg, Brad Christiansen set up Guvera Limited in Robina, Australia. In January 2010, the company launched its legal music streaming and download service Guvera. Claes Loberg currently serves as its Director of Innovation and on its board of directors. In July 2016, it was reported that Loberg would become CEO.

Guvera, acquired Blinkbox Music from UK retail chain Tesco in January 2011. Then Blinkbox was closed six months later as reported in BRW Australia.

Guvera, launched in India in 2014, at an event in Mumbai as reported in Billboard.

As of May 2017, Guvera has shut down all operations across all markets.

References

1970 births
Living people
Swedish emigrants to Australia
Swedish businesspeople
Australian businesspeople